The Harness Room is a 1971 novel by the British writer L.P. Hartley. A retired colonel about to remarry decides that his seventeen-year-old son needs toughening up and while away on his honeymoon has his chauffeur, an ex-guardsman to instruct him in boxing and other sports in the harness room. The two men come to develop a bond.

Concerned about the reception of a book that was more explicitly homosexual in theme than his earlier works, Hartley insisted to his publisher that it was done "in a more discreet manner than it is in many modern novels". Hartley considered that "I actually took more trouble over The Harness Room than any of my novels".

References

Bibliography
  Wright, Adrian. Foreign Country: The Life of L.P. Hartley. I. B. Tauris, 2001.

1971 British novels
Novels by L. P. Hartley
Hamish Hamilton books
1970s LGBT novels